Peter James Carroll (born 8 January 1953) is an English occultist, writer, and physics graduate. He is one of the originators of chaos magic theory and a cofounder of the Illuminates of Thanateros.

Career
In the late 1970s, Peter Carroll and Ray Sherwin, two young British occultists interested in ritual magic, began to publish a magazine called The New Equinox. Both men were connected with a burgeoning occult scene developing around The Phoenix, a metaphysical bookshop in London's East End. Having grown dissatisfied with the state of the magical arts and the deficiencies they saw in the available occult groups, they published a small announcement in a 1978 issue of their magazine, announcing the creation of the Illuminates of Thanateros (IOT), which has been described as "an unprecedented attempt of institutionalising one of the most individualising currents in the history of 'Western learned magic'".

Carroll first issued Liber Null in 1978 and Psychonaut in 1982. They were published together in the 1987 book Liber Null & Psychonaut, which is considered one of the defining works of the chaos magic movement. He has also written columns for the Chaos International magazine under the names Pete Carroll and Stokastikos.

Carroll elaborated a system heavily influenced by Austin Osman Spare in his early writings, particularly Liber Null (1978). However, somewhat confusingly, Carroll uses the term 'Kia' to refer to the consciousness of the individual: "the elusive 'I' which confers self-awareness". The more general universal force, of which Kia is an aspect, Carroll termed 'Chaos':

In 1995, Carroll announced his desire to step down from the "roles of magus and pontiff of chaos". This statement was originally delivered at the same IOT international meeting which Carroll discussed in an article titled "The Ice War" in Chaos International.

In 2005, he appeared as a chaos magic instructor at Maybe Logic Academy at the request of Robert Anton Wilson.

Holy Guardian Angel
Carroll split the concept of the Holy Guardian Angel in two and speaks of two Holy Guardian Angels. According to his work Liber Null and Psychonaut, one is the Augoeides, a projected image of whatever the magician strives for; and the other is quantum uncertainty, which ultimately determines the acts of the magician and is a spark of the only true creative force, the chaos of chaos magic.

Works

Books

Selected articles
Chaos Magic

 An introduction to Chaos magick technique.

Physics

See also

References

Notes

Citations

Works cited

Further reading

External links

Carroll's website
Templum Nigri Solis - A Brief History
Arcanorium College

Interviews
Peter J. Carroll Interview from Abrasax Magazine, Vol.5, No.2.
Peter J. Carroll Interview from Sinobu kurono, Kaos Knight

1953 births
Living people
20th-century English male writers
20th-century English non-fiction writers
21st-century English male writers
21st-century English non-fiction writers
Chaos magicians
English male non-fiction writers
English occult writers
English physicists